Two highways in the U.S. state of California have been signed as Route 8:

 Interstate 8 in California, part of the Interstate Highway System
 California State Route 8 (1934-1964), now SR 26